Kurzemes Vārds (from ) is a Latvian regional newspaper published in Liepāja, Latvia. The first issue was published on November 27, 1918. The newspaper is issued five times a week from Monday to Friday.

During the Soviet occupation of Latvia the newspaper was renamed to "Komunists" (from ), regaining the name Kurzemes Vārds on April 13, 1990.

The average circulation of the newspaper is 8800 copies. A Russian language version of the same name, Курземес Вардс, is issued four times a week.

References

Newspapers published in Latvia